King Lud's Entrenchments and The Drift is a  biological Site of Special Scientific Interest which straddles the border between Lincolnshire and Leicestershire, and is east of Croxton Kerrial. King Lud's Entrenchments is a Scheduled Ancient Monument.

King Lud's Entrenchments is also known as King Lud's Intrenchments or King Lud's Banks. The site has not been excavated and its date is unknown and has been thought of as a Saxon boundary ditch but aerial photographic work has suggested that it may be part of an extensive prehistoric boundary system extending from Northamptonshire to the Humber and termed `the Jurassic spine'.

This site has limestone grassland with tor-grass, cock's foot, crested dog's-tail and red fescue. Herbs include salad burnet, field scabious, germander speedwell and perforate St John's-wort, and there is also some broad-leaved semi-natural woodland.

There is access to the site and The Drift is part of the Viking Way long distance trail.

References

Sites of Special Scientific Interest in Leicestershire
Sites of Special Scientific Interest in Lincolnshire
Linear earthworks
Scheduled monuments in Leicestershire
Archaeological sites in Leicestershire